The Illuminates of Thanateros is an international magical organization that focuses on practical group work in chaos magic. The idea was first announced in 1978, while the order proper was formed in 1987. This fraternal magical society has been an important influence on some forms of modern occultism. It has been described as "an unprecedented attempt of institutionalising one of the most individualising currents in the history of ‘Western learned magic’."

The IOT has been described as "the Order for 'serious' Chaos Magicians in the same way that the OTO exists for 'serious' Thelemites." The IOT is considered to be an occult or neoshamanic organization.

Name
The name "Thanateros" is a combination of the names "Thanatos" and "Eros"— the Greek gods of death and sex, respectively. The idea is that sex and death represent the positive and negative methods of attaining "magical consciousness". The word "Illuminates" is used in accordance with the claimed tradition of calling such societies — in which those who have mastered the secrets of magic help bring others to mastership — "the Illuminati".

Its formal name is The Magical Pact of the Illuminates of Thanateros, which is usually shortened to "the Pact".

History

Early
In the late 1970s, Ray Sherwin and Peter Carroll, two young British occultists interested in ritual magic, began to publish a magazine called The New Equinox. Both men were connected with a burgeoning occult scene developing around The Phoenix, a metaphysical bookshop in London's East End. Having grown dissatisfied with the state of the magical arts and the deficiencies they saw in the available occult groups, they published a small announcement in a 1978 issue of their magazine, announcing the creation of the Illuminates of Thanateros (IOT). They described this order as a new kind of magical order, one based on a hierarchy of magical ability rather than invitation and a magical meritocracy. They described the IOT as a "spiritual heir" to the Zos Kia Cultus and a "fusion of Thelemic Magick, Tantra, The Sorceries of Zos and Tao".

Ice magick controversy
In the early 1990s the order experienced a schism as a result of conflicts about the doctrine of 'ice magick', a major proponent of which was Ralph Tegtmeier.

Peter Carroll learned more about the racial doctrines that Tegtmeier was teaching, and criticized him for it. That led to an untenable conflict between Carroll and Tegtmeier, which culminated in Tegtmeier and all of his followers seceding from the IoT. The vast majority of German and Swiss members left the order, which constituted about 30% of the order's total membership. Ralph Tegtmeier and a few others were subsequently excommunicated.

After publishing Liber Kaos, Carroll retired from active participation in the order, though he remains on good terms with many of the longstanding members.

References

Works cited

External links
 
 
 

Arts organizations established in 1987
Chaos magic
Magical organizations